Reiffton is a census-designated place (CDP) in Exeter Township, Berks County, Pennsylvania, United States. The population was 4,178 at the 2010 census.

Geography
Reiffton is located at  (40.315642, -75.872337).

Demographics
At the 2000 census there were 2,888 people, 1,079 households, and 854 families living in the CDP. The population density was 1,780.2 people per square mile (688.3/km). There were 1,099 housing units at an average density of 677.5/sq mi (261.9/km).  The racial makeup of the CDP was 97.13% White, 1.11% African American, 0.03% Native American, 1.11% Asian, 0.21% from other races, and 0.42% from two or more races. Hispanic or Latino of any race were 0.97%.

There were 1,079 households, 30.0% had children under the age of 18 living with them, 69.3% were married couples living together, 7.1% had a female householder with no husband present, and 20.8% were non-families. 18.0% of households were made up of individuals, and 9.9% were one person aged 65 or older. The average household size was 2.56 and the average family size was 2.89.

The age distribution was 22.1% under the age of 18, 4.3% from 18 to 24, 22.7% from 25 to 44, 27.8% from 45 to 64, and 23.1% 65 or older. The median age was 46 years. For every 100 females, there were 91.8 males. For every 100 females age 18 and over, there were 88.1 males.

The median household income was $60,893 and the median family income  was $68,444. Males had a median income of $50,833 versus $36,970 for females. The per capita income for the CDP was $25,866. About 1.0% of families and 1.4% of the population were below the poverty line, including none of those under age 18 and 5.7% of those age 65 or over.

References

Census-designated places in Berks County, Pennsylvania
Census-designated places in Pennsylvania